Rodrigo Fuentes (born 1984) is a Guatemalan writer. An award-winning writer of short stories, he is best known for his collection Trucha panza arriba, which was shortlisted for the 2018 Premio Hispanoamericano de Cuento Gabriel García Márquez. The book has been translated into English by Ellen Jones under the title Trout, Belly Up.

Fuentes has run literary journals such as Suelta and Traviesa. He teaches at the College of the Holy Cross in the United States, and splits his time between the US and Guatemala.

References

Guatemalan short story writers
1984 births
Living people
Guatemalan male writers